A switch is a flexible rod which is typically used for corporal punishment. Switching is similar to birching.

Punitive switching
Switches are typically made of strong and flexible wood such as hazel, birch, or hickory. Willow branches are also used, as well as branches from strong trees and large shrubs. Switches are often from a garden or an orchard nearby, or taken from the wild. In the Southeastern United States, fresh-cut, flexible cane (Arundinaria) is commonly used. The usage of switches has been hotly contested in North America and Europe.

Making a switch involves cutting it from the stem and removing twigs or directly attached leaves.  For optimal flexibility, it is cut fresh shortly before use, rather than keeping it for re-use over time. Some parents decide to make the cutting of a switch an additional form of punishment for a child, by requiring the disobedient child to cut his/her own switch.

The tamarind switch (in Creole English tambran switch) is a judicial birch-like instrument for corporal punishment made from three tamarind rods, braided and oiled, used long after independence in the Caribbean Commonwealth island states of Jamaica and Trinidad and Tobago.
The Gilbertese tribal community at Wagina in Choiseul province (Solomon Islands) reintroduced by referendum in 2005 traditional "whipping" with coconut tree branches for various offences – the national justice system opposes this.

See also
Caning
Corporal punishment in the home
Judicial corporal punishment
School corporal punishment
Switchgrass
Switchcane

References

External links
World Corporal Punishment Research

Spanking implements

ru:Розги